Vicente de la Mata (January 15, 1918 – August 4, 1980) was an Argentine football forward and manager. He played most of his club career for Independiente and played for the Argentina national team between 1937 and 1946.

Playing career

De la Mata emerged from the youth team of Central Córdoba in 1936, he was soon signed by Independiente where he spent 14 seasons, scoring 151 goals in 362 games for the club. He was part of three championship winning teams and played alongside Antonio Sastre and Arsenio Erico. He is fondly remembered as one of the club's greatest ever players.

De la Mata played for Argentina on thirteen occasions between 1937 and 1946, scoring six goals. He played for Argentina in the Copa América on three occasions, each won by Argentina. In 1937 he scored both goals in the 2–0 win over Brazil in the final. He was also part of the squads that won the tournament in 1945 and 1946.

In 1951 he returned to Rosario to play for Newell's Old Boys and retired in 1952.

Managerial career
De La Mata went on to become a football manager, he had spells in charge of Independiente, Deportivo Morón, Dock Sud and Central Córdoba.

Honours

Club
Independiente
 Argentine Primera División: 1938, 1939, 1948
 Copa Ibarguren (2): 1938, 1939
 Copa Adrián Escobar (1): 1939
 Copa Aldao (2): 1938, 1939

National team
Argentina
 Copa América (3): 1937, 1945, 1946

References

External links
independiente1905.com.ar/historia/delamata.htm Independiente profile 
  

1918 births
1980 deaths
Footballers from Rosario, Santa Fe
Argentine footballers
Association football forwards
Argentina international footballers
Argentine Primera División players
Central Córdoba de Rosario footballers
Club Atlético Independiente footballers
Newell's Old Boys footballers
Argentine football managers
Club Atlético Independiente managers
Copa América-winning players